Isabelita is a 1940 Argentine comedy film directed by Manuel Romero and starring Paulina Singerman, Tito Lusiardo and Sofía Bozán.

Cast
 Paulina Singerman as Alcira García Méndez / Isabelita  
 Tito Lusiardo as Galíndez  
 Sofía Bozán as Elena  
 Juan Carlos Thorry as Luciano Fuentes  
 Enrique Roldán as Ricardo Pérez Rodríguez  
 Carmen del Moral as Emma Fuentes  
 Alberto Bello as Emilio García Méndez  
 Roberto Blanco as Raúl García Méndez  
 Mary Dormal as Dolores García Méndez  
 Rosa Martín as Valentina's friend 
 Alicia Aymont as Mrs. Pérez Rodríguez  
 Adolfo Linvel as Jeweler

References

Bibliography 
Karush, Matthew B. Culture of Class: Radio and Cinema in the Making of a Divided Argentina, 1920–1946. Duke University Press, 2012.

External links 
 

1940 films
Argentine comedy films
1940 comedy films
1940s Spanish-language films
Films directed by Manuel Romero
Argentine black-and-white films
1940s Argentine films